Elections to Purbeck District Council were held on 7 May 1998.  One third of the council was up for election and the council stayed under no overall control.

After the election, the composition of the council was
Liberal Democrat 8
Conservative 6
Independent 5
Labour 3

Election result

References
"Council poll results", The Guardian 9 May 1998 page 16

1998
1998 English local elections
20th century in Dorset